Kirti Kulhari (born 30 May 1985) is an Indian actress who works in Hindi-language films and series. She made her acting debut with the film Khichdi: The Movie in 2010 and then starred in Shaitan in 2011. She then appeared in the films Jal (2013), Pink (2016), Indu Sarkar (2017),  Uri: The Surgical Strike (2019), and Mission Mangal (2019).

Kulhari has starred in several web series, which includes Four More Shots Please!  (2019–present) on Amazon Prime Video, Criminal Justice (2020) and Human (2022) on Disney+Hotstar.

Personal life
Kulhari was born and brought up in Bombay (now Mumbai), Maharashtra. Her family hails from Jhunjhunu district in Rajasthan. Her father was a Commander in the Indian Navy. Kulhari married actor Saahil Sehgal in 2016. She announced separation from him on 1 April 2021.

Acting career

Early career
Kulhari started her career with theatre and TV commercials. She did a one-month acting workshop with a Hindi theatre group called Yatri Theatre, under the direction and guidance of Om Katare. After that, She worked on three plays -  Chinta Chhod Chintamani with Yatri Theatre, Shehenshah of Azeemo with AK Various productions and a Hindi adaptation of Sakharam Binder with Yatri Theatre. Kulhari was the face of many television commercials – Lotus Mutual Funds, Travel Guru, Videocon Air Conditioners, Parachute Gorgeous Hamesha Campaign, ICICI Bank, Kaya Skin Clinic, Taj Mahal Tea, Everyuth Face Wash, Whirlpool Refrigerators , Spice Mobile, Virgin Mobiles , Close-up, JK White Cement and Tic Tac mouth freshener. For two years, Kulhari was the face of beauty brand Nivea Visage Sparkling Glow's face. Kulhari was also a part of music videos – "Hik Vich Jaan" in Desi Rockstar 2 album by Gippy Grewal.

Kulhari started her film acting career in Bollywood with Khichdi: The Movie, which released in October 2010. Kulhari was noticed as an actress for her second film, Shaitan, which released in June 2011.

Breakthrough (2016–present)
In 2016, she was seen in Pink with Tapsee Pannu and Amitabh Bacchan in which her performance was praised. The film was both commercially and critically successful. In 2017, she appeared in the title role of Indu in Madhur Bhandarkar's political thriller film Indu Sarkar. In 2018, she starred in Blackmail with Irrfan Khan.

In 2019, she appeared in the role of an Indian Air Force officer Seerat Kaur in the commercially and critically successful military action film Uri: The Surgical Strike. The same year, she also appeared in the web television series Four More Shots Please! on Amazon Prime Video and Bard of Blood on Netflix. She acted in Mission Mangal, a film based on India's Mars Orbiter Mission, which was released on 15 August 2019.

In August 2020, Kulhari joined the cast of The Girl On The Train directed by Ribhu Dasgupta. It also features Parineeti Chopra, Aditi Rao Hydari, Avinash Tiwary, Sammy Jonas Heaney. 

In January 2022, Kulhari turned producer by launching production house Kintsukuroi Films and will star in its first project, a dark comedy thriller film Nayeka written and directed by Ajaykiran Nair. Kirti started shooting for the film on 2 January.

Filmography

Film

Web series

Awards and nominations

See also

List of Indian film actresses
List of people from Rajasthan

Footnotes

References

External links

Living people
1985 births
Actresses from Mumbai
People from Jhunjhunu district
Actresses from Rajasthan
Indian film actresses
Indian web series actresses
Actresses in Hindi cinema
Filmfare Awards winners
21st-century Indian actresses